Sukesh Hegde is an Indian professional kabaddi player who currently plays as a raider for Bengal Warriors in the Pro Kabaddi League.

Early life
Sukesh Hegde was born and brought up in Karkala in a kannada speaking family. He has completed his graduation from Alva's College, Moodbidri.

Career
In 2014, he started his Pro Kabaddi League journey as a raider of Telugu Titans. In 2017, Sukesh was picked by Gujarat Fortune Giants as their captain for their maiden campaign. In 2018, he was signed by Tamil Thalaivas and in 2019, he was purchased by Bengal Warriors.

Career statistics

References

Kabaddi players from Karnataka
1989 births
Living people
Indian sportsmen
Pro Kabaddi League players